"Gratitude" is a song by American rap rock group the Beastie Boys, from their third studio album Check Your Head. It was released in October 1992 as the fourth single for the album, primarily serviced to modern rock radio. The live version B-side was recorded in September 1992.

The bass guitar in the song uses a Univox Superfuzz. The song was included in the video game Guitar Hero 5.

Music video
The music video to this song is a homage to the 1972 concert film Pink Floyd: Live at Pompeii and was recorded in Rotorua, New Zealand.  The video was featured on Beavis and Butthead, who gave the song a positive review.

Covers
After touring as the opening act for the Beastie Boys, the Rollins Band often interweaved their own version of "Gratitude" (with new lyrics improvised by Henry Rollins) into their live set during their 1992 tour.

Post-hardcore/punk band Refused covered this song on their Demos Collection.

Punk rock/hip hop band the Transplants covered the song on their 2017 covers EP Take Cover.

Rap Rock/Nu metal band Bull Ball covered this song on their "Gratitude" Single, 2018

Track listing
"Gratitude" (LP version)
"Stand Together" (Live)
"Finger Lickin'" (Good Government Cheese Mix)
"Gratitude" (Live at Budokan)
"Honky Rink" (Previously Unreleased)

References

1992 singles
1992 songs
Beastie Boys songs
Songs written by Ad-Rock
Songs written by Mike D
Songs written by Adam Yauch
Song recordings produced by Mario Caldato Jr.
Capitol Records singles